Desouk is a city in northern Egypt. Located 80 km east of Alexandria, in the Kafr El Sheikh Governorate and had a population of 137,660 inhabitants as of 2011. It is bordered to the west by the Beheira Governorate.

Desouk dates back to at least c. 3200 BC and was part of the ancient city of Buto before the unification of Upper and Lower Egypt. From 1250 to 1517, the city of Desouk was part of the Gharbia province. From 1798 to 1801, it was part of the now-defunct Rosetta province.

Etymology 
The cult of Sobek had presence to the west of Disuq, on the other side of the Nile.

Overview

Desouk is a member of the Organization of Islamic Capitals and Cities due to the location of important Islamic shrines in the city, such as the tomb of Egyptian Sufi Saint Ibrahim El Desouki, which is located in the main mosque in the center of Desouk.

Desouk lies on the Nile, on the eastern banks of the Rosetta branch, where there are only two bridges entering the city.

Many important Egyptians hail from Desouk: Youssef El-Mansy, Ahmed Zewail, Mohammed Roshdy, Evelyn Ashamallah, and Abdel-Salam Mohammed Nasar, a politician in the city.

Climate
Köppen-Geiger climate classification system classifies its climate as hot desert (BWh), the same as the rest of Egypt.

Notable people
 Mohsen Hendawy (born 1981), Egyptian footballer

See also

 List of cities and towns in Egypt
 Buto
 Desouk SC
 Desouk Stadium
 Desouki
 Desouk Bridge

References

External links

 The official site of Presidency of Desouk City (Arabic)
 The official site of Kafr el-Sheikh Governorate (Arabic, English)
 The official site of Desouk City in Kafr el-Sheikh Governorate (Arabic, English)

 
Populated places in Kafr El Sheikh Governorate
Cities in ancient Egypt
Populated places established in the 8th millennium BC
8th-millennium BC establishments